The 2008 Ms. Olympia contest 
is an IFBB professional bodybuilding competition and part of Joe Weider's Olympia Fitness & Performance Weekend 2008 was held on September 26, 2008, at the South Hall in the Las Vegas Convention Center in Winchester, Nevada and in the Orleans Arena at The Orleans Hotel and Casino in Paradise, Nevada. It was the 29th Ms. Olympia competition held. Other events at the exhibition include the 212 Olympia Showdown, Mr. Olympia, Fitness Olympia, and Figure Olympia contests.

Prize money
 1st $30,000
 2nd $18,000
 3rd $10,000
 4th $7,000
 5th $4,000
 6th $2,000
Total: $71,000

Results
 1st - Iris Kyle
 2nd - Betty Viana-Adkins
 3rd - Yaxeni Oriquen-Garcia
 4th - Lisa Aukland
 5th - Dayana Cadeau
 6th - Cathy LeFrançois
 7th - Betty Pariso
 8th - Mah-Ann Mendoza
 9th - Jeannie Paparone
 10th - Jennifer Sedia
 11th - Nicole Ball
 12th - Brenda Raganot
 13th - Debbie Bramwell
 14th - Heather Armbrust
 15th - Rosemary Jennings
 16th - Sherry Smith
 17th - Klaudia Larson

Comparison to previous Olympia results:
Same - Iris Kyle
+5 - Betty Viana-Adkins
Same - Yaxeni Oriquen-Garcia
Same - Lisa Aukland
-3 - Dayana Cadeau
-2 - Cathy LeFrançois
-1 - Betty Pariso
+5 - Mah-Ann Mendoza
-2 - Nicole Ball
+3 - Brenda Raganot
-9 - Heather Armbrust
Same - Rosemary Jennings

Scorecard

Attended
11th Ms. Olympia attended - Yaxeni Oriquen-Garcia
10th Ms. Olympia attended - Iris Kyle
9th Ms. Olympia attended - Dayana Cadeau
7th Ms. Olympia attended - Betty Pariso
4th Ms. Olympia attended - Lisa Aukland and Mah-Ann Mendoza
3rd Ms. Olympia attended - Betty Viana-Adkins, Brenda Raganot, and Rosemary Jennings
2nd Ms. Olympia attended - Heather Armbrust, Cathy LeFrançois, and Nicole Ball
1st Ms. Olympia attended - Debbie Bramwell, Jeannie Paparone, Jennifer Sedia, Sherry Smith, and Klaudia Larson
Previous year Olympia attendees who did not attend - Antoinette Norman, Stephanie Kessler, Tazzie Colomb, Valentina Chepiga, Annie Rivieccio, Sarah Dunlap, and Bonnie Priest

Notable events
This was Iris Kyle's 4th overall Olympia win and thus tied her with Kim Chizevsky-Nicholls with the number of overall Olympia wins.
Betty Viana-Adkins placed 2nd this Olympia, the best placing she has ever had at the Olympia.

2008 Ms. Olympia Qualified

See also
 2008 Mr. Olympia

References

2008 in bodybuilding
Ms. Olympia
Ms. Olympia
History of female bodybuilding
Ms. Olympia 2008